Air Services of India was a private airline based at Juhu Aerodrome in Mumbai, in India. The airline was merged into the Indian Airlines Corporation in 1953.

History Of Aeroplane Service 
The airline was formed in 1936 and initially served routes on the Kathiawar Peninsula and to Poona. with aircraft like the de Havilland Dragonfly, Airspeed Courier, Percival Vega Gulls and de Havilland Fox Moths. In the beginning of 1939, it opened a new line between Kolhapur and Juhu Aerodrome in Mumbai. The thrice a week service was officially inaugurated by the Maharaja of Kolhapur, who showed considerable interest in the project, subsidised the service and built an airport at Kolhapur. 

In 1941, Air Services of India was purchased by The Scindia Steam Navigation Company Ltd. and became known as the Scindia line. Services resumed on 3 May 1946 after World War 2 with a small fleet of De Havilland Dragon Rapides and 11 former United States Air Force Douglas C-47 Skytrains converted for civilian use. Air Services of India was the only airline using the French-built Sud-Ouest Corse for civilian purposes, having two of them in their fleet. By 1953, when the Air Corporations Act was passed, it had an extensive network from Cochin to Lucknow and became Line 7 of the Indian Airlines Corporation.

Destinations
Air Services of India served cities mostly in the Western regions of British India including Karachi which is now in Pakistan.
India
Gujarat
Bhavnagar - Bhavnagar Airport
Bhuj - Bhuj Airport
Jamnagar - Jamnagar Airport
Keshod - Keshod Airport
Porbandar - Porbandar Airport
Rajkot - Rajkot Airport
Karnataka
Bangalore - Bangalore Airport
Belgaum - Belgaum Airport
Kerala
Kochi - Willingdon Island Airport
Madhya Pradesh
Indore - Devi Ahilyabai Holkar Airport
Gwalior - Gwalior Airport
Maharashtra
Mumbai - Juhu Aerodrome Hub
Pune - Pune International Airport
Uttar Pradesh
Kanpur - Kanpur Airport
Lucknow - Amausi International Airport
Pakistan
Karachi - Karachi Airport

Incidents and Accidents 
On 25 January 1950, A C-47 registered as VT-CPQ, carrying cargo crashed on take-off at Shella Airport. There were no casualties.

On 9 May 1953, A C-47 registered as VT-AXD, crashed on take-off at Juhu Airport causing the aircraft to be written off. The undercarriage was retracted before the aircraft became airborne on its takeoff roll causing the aircraft to drop back on its belly. There were no casualties.

References

Defunct airlines of India
Airlines established in 1936
Airlines disestablished in 1953